Tetramorium pilosum, is a species of ant in the subfamily Myrmicinae. It is found in Sri Lanka, and China.

References

External links

 at antwiki.org
Animaldiversity.org
Itis.org
AntKey.org

pilosum
Hymenoptera of Asia
Insects described in 1893